Lansingerland is a municipality in the western Netherlands, in the province of South Holland. It was formed on 1 January 2007, by the merger of the municipalities of Berkel en Rodenrijs, Bleiswijk and Bergschenhoek, collectively known as the "B-Triangle". The former municipality of Tempel, abolished in 1855, is also part of Lansingerland.

The name was chosen from a competition and derived from the name Lansingh, the height-of-land between the Delfland and Schieland Water Boards, which runs between the "3B-Triangle" villages. The choice of name is symbolic: the name of the border that formerly divided the area, now unites it. The "h" in Lansingh was dropped to ease spelling.

Lansingerland consists of the following communities:
Bergschenhoek
Berkel en Rodenrijs
Bleiswijk
Tempel (deserted)
De Rotte
Kruisweg

Topography

Dutch Topographic map of the municipality of Lansingerland, June 2015

Politics
On 18 September 2007 Ewald van Vliet was installed as the first mayor of Lansingerland. 
 

The municipal council of Lansingerland consisted of 31 seats now 33. The council was renewed in 2022 and sits for four-year cycles in accordance with Dutch municipal election laws.

Notable people 
 Maria van Utrecht (ca.1551 in Rodenrijs - 1629) a notable figure in the Dutch Revolt
 Piet Rietveld (1952 in Berkel en Rodenrijs – 2013) a Dutch economist and Professor in Transport Economics
 Wilco Zeelenberg (born 1966 in Bleiswijk) a Dutch former professional Grand Prix motorcycle road racer
 Joost Luiten (born 1986 in Bleiswijk) a Dutch professional golfer who plays on the European Tour

References

External links
Official website

 
Municipalities of South Holland
Municipalities of the Netherlands established in 2007